Dambanang Kawayan, officially known as Saint John the Baptist Parish, is a Roman Catholic parish-church located in Barangay Ligid-Tipas in Taguig, Philippines.
 
This church of Tipas formerly belonged to the Immaculate Conception Parish of Pasig and later transferred to the Shrine of Saint Anne in Sta. Ana, Taguig City. On November 17, 1969, Cardinal Rufino Jiao Santos formally erected the parish under the patronage of St. John the Baptist. The first parish priest appointed was Rev. Fr. Ruben "Ben" J. Villote. The word "Tipas" comes from the word "Tinagpas" or "Tiga-gapas" because the original taga-Tipas were farmers.

From 1969 to 2003, the Parish of St. John the Baptist was a part of the Archdiocese of Manila. Presently, it belongs to the Vicariate of St. Anne under the Diocese of Pasig. Rev. Fr. Glenn B. Gaabucayan is the current parish priest.

Land Area

Total land area: 3.62 square kilometers
Parish lot area: 27,531 square meters

Boundaries

 Northeast – Laguna Lake
 Northwest – Pateros and Pasig
 Southeast – Barangay Sta. Ana
 Southwest – Barangay Ususan and Tuktukan

Parish Priests

External links

 Bamboo Church
 Coordinates

References

 About Poblacion-Tipas
 The Roman Catholic Diocese of Pasig

Buildings and structures in Taguig
Christian organizations established in 1969
Roman Catholic churches in Metro Manila